The Toy is a 1976 French comedy-drama film directed by Francis Veber.

The film was remade in 1982 as the American film The Toy.

Plot
The movie tells the story of a little boy who is trying to prove his father wrong by acting exactly like him. His father "buys" people and nothing can stop him from getting what he wants. His son does not see why he cannot do the same and decides to buy a man, who he encountered at the toy shop. The man he chose happened to be a journalist at his father's newspaper. Gradually with the help of his “toy” the boy manages to prove his father's wrong deeds by exposing them in the newspaper produced by him and his "toy". Along this journey, the boy establishes warm relationships with the man and refuses to stay with his father any longer. The message behind the story is that love and respect matter more than money.

Cast
Pierre Richard as François Perrin
Michel Bouquet as Pierre Rambal-Cochet
Fabrice Greco as Eric Rambal-Cochet
Jacques François as Blénac
Michel Aumont as Le directeur du magasin 
Gérard Jugnot as Pignier
Éva Darlan as The Press Secretary
Michel Robin as The domestic
Charles Gérard as The photographer
Yves Barsacq as Robert

References

External links

1976 films
1976 comedy-drama films
French comedy-drama films
1976 directorial debut films
Films about children
Films about friendship
Films about journalists
Films directed by Francis Veber
Films with screenplays by Francis Veber
Films scored by Vladimir Cosma
1976 comedy films
1976 drama films
1970s French films